The Embassy of the Republic of Korea in Washington, D.C. is the diplomatic mission of South Korea to the United States. Its main chancery is located at 2450 Massachusetts Avenue, Northwest, Washington, D.C., in the Embassy Row neighborhood. The current ambassador is Cho Tae-yong.

Building details
Due to the rather small size of its main chancery building, the embassy has an annex nearby in Arlington County, Virginia. It also occupies two additional buildings close to its main chancery building to house its Consular Section and a Korean Cultural Center. The ambassador's residence is located in the nearby Spring Valley neighborhood, close to American University.

Consulates
The embassy operates consulates general in Atlanta, Boston, Chicago, Honolulu, Houston, Los Angeles, New York City, San Francisco and Seattle. In addition to those consulates general, the embassy also maintains a consulate agency in Guam as well as two consular offices in Anchorage and Dallas.

A statue of Dr. Philip Jaisohn, an independence activist and journalist, was dedicated in 2008 in front of the Consular Section building at 2320 Massachusetts Ave. N.W.

The consulate includes the Korean Education Center.

List of ambassadors

After the independence of Korea from Japanese rule in 1945, and the founding of Republic of Korea (South Korea) in 1948, South Korea immediately restored normal diplomatic relationship with the United States and has since been sending ambassadors to the United States. Although Chang Myon is officially recorded as the first ambassador serving from February 1949, Chough Pyung-ok was recognized in August 1948 as the Special Representative of the President of South Korea with a personal rank of Ambassador. Chang replaced Chough in January 1949 in the same capacity, and was appointed as the first ambassador the following month.

South Korea has so far sent twenty-four ambassadors to the United States, excluding 2 Chargé d'affaires a.i. (Koo Chong-whay and Oh Jay-hee). As Chung Il-kwon served twice as the third and fifth ambassador, a total of twenty-three different people have served in the position.

Reflecting the United States' significance to South Korea's diplomacy, almost all of these ambassadors have been chosen from elites in their respective fields. For instance, the four most recent ambassadors have all been either career diplomats who had served in the high levels of the Ministry of Foreign Affairs (e.g., Ahn Ho-young, Choi Young-jin, and Lee Tae-sik), or in high government positions such as Prime Minister and head of the Finance Ministry (e.g., Han Duck-soo) before being appointed to Washington, D.C.

A complete list of ambassadors is provided below in the order of appointment. All held the title of Ambassador Extraordinary and Plenipotentiary while in office.

Consular locations and jurisdictions

South Korea maintains 9 Consulate Generals, 1 Consulate Agency, and 2 Consular Offices in addition to its main embassy in Washington, D.C., to better offer diplomatic services to Korean and foreign nationals from every corner of the United States. The main embassy located in Washington, D.C., 9 Consulate Generals located within the 50 states, and the Consulate Agency located in Guam split the United States territory into 11 non-overlapping consular jurisdictions, and each diplomatic post offers consular services within its exclusive jurisdiction only. On the other hand, the 2 Consular Offices located in Anchorage and Dallas do not control over an exclusive consular jurisdiction and instead offer consular services to those from Alaska and Dallas–Fort Worth metro area respectively, who otherwise would have to travel to the Consulate Generals in Seattle and Houston, respectively.

The Consulate Agency in Guam was originally established in 1970 as a Consulate Agency under control of the Consulate General in Honolulu. Although upgraded to a Consulate General in 1977, it was eventually downgraded back to a Consulate Agency in 1999 and since then once again the Consulate General in Honolulu has been controlling the Agency.

The Consular Office in Anchorage was originally established in 1980 as a Consulate General but was closed in 1999. It was reopened in 2007 as a Consular Office and has been under control of the Consulate General in Seattle.

The Consular Office in Dallas, the most recent addition to the list of Korean diplomatic posts in the United States, was established in 2012 under control of the Consulate General in Houston. This reflects the rapid growth of the Korean community in Dallas–Fort Worth metro area as well as the strengthening business ties between Korea and northern Texas.

The list of the 11 Korean diplomatic establishments in the United States as well as select information regarding those are provided below:

See also
 Koreans in Washington, D.C.
 Old Korean Legation Museum

References

External links

 (English)
 (Korean)

Korea, South
Washington, D.C.
South Korea–United States relations
Bahamas–South Korea relations
 
South Korea